Clelland House, also known as the Houghton House and Clelland-Houghton-Wallace Log House, is a historic home located near Grafton, Taylor County, West Virginia. It was built about 1800, and consists of a two-story main section constructed of "V"-notched logs, with a one-story frame kitchen wing.  It was designed with one chimney and one large room on each floor.  It is the oldest surviving house in the area.

It was listed on the National Register of Historic Places in 1980.

References

Houses on the National Register of Historic Places in West Virginia
Houses completed in 1800
Houses in Taylor County, West Virginia
Scotch-Irish American culture in West Virginia
Scottish-American culture in West Virginia
National Register of Historic Places in Taylor County, West Virginia
Log buildings and structures on the National Register of Historic Places in West Virginia